

{{DISPLAYTITLE:Psi6 Aurigae}}

Psi6 Aurigae, Latinized from ψ6 Aurigae, is a spectroscopic binary star in the northern constellation of Auriga. It is a dim, naked eye star with an apparent visual magnitude of +5.22.

This is a single-lined spectroscopic binary star system with an orbital period of 5,996 days (16.4 years) and an eccentricity of 0.044. The visible component is a K-type giant star with a stellar classification of K0.5 III. It is most likely (78% chance) on the red giant branch and is around 1.55 billion years old. As such, it has an estimated double the mass of the Sun and about 18 times the Sun's radius. The star is radiating about 123 times the Sun's luminosity from its photosphere at an effective temperature of 4,574 K.

See also
 Psi Aurigae

References

External links
 HR 2487
 Image Psi6 Aurigae

K-type giants
Auriga (constellation)
Aurigae, Psi06
BD+48 1436
Aurigae, 57
048781
032562
2487
Spectroscopic binaries